Taner Savut (10 August 1974 –  6 February 2023) was a Turkish sporting director and footballer who played as a right back.

Playing career
Born in İzmir, Savut began his career at hometown club İzmirspor in 1994 before joining Fenerbahçe in 1997. He played his sole European match on 29 September that year as the team lost 2–1 at home to Steaua București in the UEFA Cup first round. In 1999 he moved to fellow Süper Lig team Göztepe and a year later Siirtspor, where he scored his only goal of 71 top-flight appearances, concluding a 3–0 home win over Gençlerbirliği on 6 May 2001. He then played in lower divisions for Sakaryaspor, Alanyaspor and Tokatspor until 2011.

Administrative career
Savut was sporting director at Manisa before joining top-flight Hatayspor in July 2022.

Death
Savut died in the 2023 Turkey–Syria earthquake which struck on 6 February, in the same building collapse that killed Hatayspor player Christian Atsu. He was 48, and his body was found on 21 February.

References

1974 births
2023 deaths
Footballers from İzmir
Turkish footballers
Association football defenders
İzmirspor footballers
Fenerbahçe S.K. footballers
Göztepe S.K. footballers
Siirtspor footballers
Sakaryaspor footballers
Alanyaspor footballers
Tokatspor footballers
Süper Lig players
Victims of the 2023 Turkey–Syria earthquakes